Mike Rose (born July 23, 1992) is a professional Canadian football defensive lineman for the Calgary Stampeders of the Canadian Football League (CFL). He played college football for NC State Wolfpack from 2011 to 2015.

College career

Freshman and sophomore years

In 2012, after playing at Hillcrest High School and redshirting his first year, Rose played in a few of games racking up 5 solo tackles, 2 assisted tackles, and 1 tackle for loss. But Rose made a name for himself when he made a key play by blocking a punt against Florida State helping the Wolfpack win in an upset against the Seminoles. As a Sophomore In 2013, he played in 7 games finishing the year with 9 solo tackles, 9 assisted tackles, 3.5 tackles for loss, 2 sacks, 2 pass deflections, and 2 fumble recoveries.

Junior and senior years

As a Junior in 2014, Rose played in every game and ended the season with 28 solo tackles, 17 assisted tackles, 13 tackles for loss, 4 sacks, 2 pass deflections, 2 fumble recoveries, and a forced fumble leading the Wolfpack to a 9-4 Season. In 2015, Rose played in every game again as a senior ending up with 34 solo tackles, 15 assisted tackles, 15.5 tackles for loss, 9 sacks, a fumble recovery, and 2 forced fumbles.

Professional career

New York Giants 
After going undrafted in the 2016 NFL Draft he went to New York Giants tryouts where he was signed. On August 30, 2016, he was waived by the Giants.

Calgary Stampeders 
Rose signed with the Calgary Stampeders on May 24, 2017. He spent time on the practice roster and reserve roster before making his professional debut on November 3, 2017 against the Winnipeg Blue Bombers. He played in one regular season game in 2018 and was on the injured reserve list when the Stampeders won the 106th Grey Cup. Rose had his breakthrough season in 2019 when he played in all 18 regular season games and recorded 46 defensive tackles, four special teams tackles, five sacks, and one forced fumble. He re-signed with the Stampeders to a two-year extension on January 21, 2020.

References

External links
 Calgary Stampeders bio
 

1992 births
Living people
Players of American football from South Carolina
American football defensive linemen
Canadian football defensive linemen
Players of Canadian football from South Carolina
NC State Wolfpack football players
Calgary Stampeders players